

League
Records in this section refer to Liga I from its founding in 1909 through to the present.

Clubs

Titles
Most League titles: 20, FC Steaua Bucuresti (1951, 1952, 1953, 1956, 1959–60, 1960–61, 1967–68, 1975–76, 1977–78, 1984–85, 1985–86, 1986–87, 1987–88, 1988–89, 1992–93, 1993–94, 1994–95, 1995–96, 1996–97,
Most consecutive League titles: 6, Chinezul Timișoara (1921–22, 1922–23, 1923–24, 1924–25, 1925–26, 1926–27) and Steaua București (1992–93, 1993–94, 1994–95, 1995–96, 1996–97, 1997–98)

Top flight appearances 
Most Appearances: 72, FCSB

Wins 
Most Wins Overall: 1224, FCSB
Most Consecutive Wins: 21, FCSB (1988)

Draws 
Most Draws Overall: 508, FCSB
Most Consecutive Draws: 8, FCM Bacău (1979)

Losses 
Most Losses Overall: 717, Universitatea Cluj
Most Consecutive Losses: 24, ASA Târgu Mureş (1988)

Points 
Most Points Overall: 4180, FCSB

Players

Appearances

Goals

Managers

Referees

Most successful clubs overall (official titles, 1909–present)

Honours table

Teams in Italics no longer exist. 
Teams in Bold compete in 2022–23 Liga I.

This table is updated as of 19th of May 2022, following Sepsi Sfântu Gheorghe winning the 2021–22 Cupa României.

All-time table
The ranking is computed awarding three points for a win, one for a draw. It includes matches played between the 1932–33 and 2021–22 season including. The teams in bold play in the 2022–23 season of Liga I. The teams in italics no longer exist.

This table lists only league finishes since 1932–33, when a national league was first introduced. Since an official national championship has been awarded since 1909, some teams are not listed with all their championships. For example, Venus București have been champions for seven times, but are listed only with the four titles they have won since 1932.

League or status at 2022–23:

See also 
List of Romanian football champions
List of football clubs in Romania by major honors won

References

 
Football in Romania
All-time football league tables